New Rome is another name for Constantinople.

New Rome may also refer to:

Places

United States
New Rome, Minnesota
New Rome, Ohio
New Rome, Wisconsin

Other
Paris, designated nouvelle Rome at various stages of history between the reigns of Philip IV and Louis XIV
Italian Empire/Italian imperialism under Fascism, as an empire

See also

 
Rome (disambiguation)
Byzantism
Constantinople (disambiguation)
Nova Roma
Nova Roma (disambiguation)
Rome II (disambiguation)
Second Rome (disambiguation)
Third Rome
Times New Roman
Pax Americana
Translatio imperii